Hovorčovice is a municipality and village in Prague-East District in the Central Bohemian Region of the Czech Republic. It has about 2,500 inhabitants.

History
The first written mention of Hovorčovice is from 1088.

Gallery

References

External links

 (in Czech)

Villages in Prague-East District